The Fighting Texan is a 1937 American Western film directed by Charles Abbott and written by Joseph O'Donnell. The film stars Kermit Maynard, Elaine Shepard, Frank LaRue, Budd Buster, Ed Cassidy, Murdock MacQuarrie, Art Miles and Bruce Mitchell. The film was released on June 1, 1937, by Ambassador Pictures.

Plot
The story follows rancher Glenn Oliver, who has been noticing a decrease in his horse population, while a nearby ranch is getting more and more horses.

Cast           
Kermit Maynard as Glenn Oliver
Elaine Shepard as Judy Walton
Frank LaRue as Joe Walton
Budd Buster as Old-timer 
Ed Cassidy as Pete Hadley
Murdock MacQuarrie as Jim Perkins 
Art Miles as Carter
Bruce Mitchell	as Sheriff Bert Winder
Bob Woodward as Bob

References

External links
 

1937 films
American Western (genre) films
1937 Western (genre) films
Films based on works by James Oliver Curwood
American black-and-white films
1930s English-language films
1930s American films